NK Croatia was a Croatian football club based in the town of Đakovo in Croatia.

In June 2012, Croatia merged with its city rivals NK Đakovo to form HNK Đakovo Croatia.

Honours 

 Treća HNL – East:
Winners (1): 2005–06

Croatia Djakovo
Football clubs in Osijek-Baranja County
Association football clubs established in 1971
1971 establishments in Croatia
Sport in Đakovo